The Silver River is a  stream near the northern tip of the Keweenaw Peninsula in the U.S. state of Michigan.

References 

Rivers of Michigan
Rivers of Keweenaw County, Michigan
Tributaries of Lake Superior